The ANI file format is a graphics file format used for animated mouse cursors on the Microsoft Windows operating system.

The format is based on the Microsoft Resource Interchange File Format, which is used as a container for storing the individual frames (which are standard Windows icons) of the animation.

File structure 
Animated cursors contain the following information: (in order of position in the file)

 Name (optional)
 Artist information (optional)
 Default frame rate
 Sequence information
 Cursor hotspot
 Individual frame(s), in ICO format
 Individual frame rates (optional)

Frame rates are measured in jiffies, with one jiffy equal to 1/60 of a second, or 16.666 ms.

Sequencing 
Sequence information present in the file determines the sequence of frames, and allows frames to be played more than once, or in a different order than that in which they appear in the file. For example, if the animation contains three different images numbered 1, 2 and 3, and the sequence is 1-2-3-2-1, (five frames) then only three icons need to be stored in the file, thereby saving storage space.

See also 
Pointer (user interface)
ICO (file format)

External links 
Description of the ani file format
Vulnerability in Windows Animated Cursor Handling
.Ani Editor

Graphics file formats
Windows architecture